Acinetobacter tandoii is a Gram-negative, strictly aerobic bacterium from the genus Acinetobacter isolated from activated sludge.

References

External links
Type strain of Acinetobacter tandoii at BacDive -  the Bacterial Diversity Metadatabase

Moraxellaceae
Bacteria described in 2003